The 2020 12 Hours of Sebring (formally known as the 68th Mobil 1 Twelve Hours of Sebring Presented by Advance Auto Parts) was an endurance sports car race held at Sebring International Raceway near Sebring, Florida from 11–14 November 2020, after being postponed from its original date on 14-15 March 2020 due to the COVID-19 outbreak. The race was the final round of the 2020 WeatherTech SportsCar Championship, as well as the final round of the Michelin Endurance Cup. Action Express Racing entered as the defending overall winners of the 12-hour event.

Background

The 2020 12 Hours of Sebring event is run in conjunction with the 2020 1000 Miles of Sebring, held on the Friday before the 12 Hours of Sebring. The two events are run in conjunction with each other as an agreement between the International Motor Sports Association (IMSA), the governing body of the WeatherTech SportsCar Championship, and the FIA, to be a joint weekend, known colloquially as “Super Sebring.” The first joint weekend between the two events was run a year prior in 2019, to massive success, providing some of the largest attendance figures ever recorded in the history of the 12 Hours of Sebring. Initially announced on a one-year deal, the success of the 2019 Super Sebring would lead to confirmation that the 1000 Miles of Sebring and 12 Hours of Sebring would run together again for the following year, however due to travel restrictions brought about by COVID-19 the 1000 Miles of Sebring would not return until 2022.

Results

Race

References

External links

12 Hours of Sebring
12 Hours of Sebring
12 Hours of Sebring
12 Hours of Sebring
Motorsport events postponed due to the COVID-19 pandemic